The Delta Bowl was a college football game played at Crump Stadium in Memphis, Tennessee.  It was the precursor to the now long-standing Liberty Bowl, the current bowl game held in Memphis since 1965 (although starting at Philadelphia in 1959). The Delta Bowl had games played on New Years Day in both 1948 and 1949. 

The Delta Bowl became known as the bowl that shocked the football world, landing successful, prestigious teams in its inaugural season, out-performing much more prestigious bowls for the 1948 New Year's Day game.

Their luck followed them into the second season. Bowl officials signed the University of Tulsa to appear in the 1949 game prior to the start of the season with the expectation that the team would perform well; however, Tulsa "tanked," starting the year 0–8 and had to be replaced. Bowl officials managed to sign on another team that ended ranked, William & Mary, which ended the season 20th in the AP poll, another fortuitous stroke for bowl officials.

The first president and organizer of the Delta Bowl was Richard Hyde Dewey, living in Memphis, before moving to Decatur, Alabama, several years later. 

At the close of the 1947 football season, Ole Miss was ranked 12th while TCU also had a successful season, both teams surprised by their successes. In fact, the college administrations for both schools had thought their teams would not make it to a bowl game that year before the season started, as there were only 13 bowls. Thus, they happily accepted an invitation to the newly formed Delta Bowl prior to the kick-off of their first games. Surprisingly, both teams surged as the season went on, and the fan bases and coaches reportedly became nervous, knowing they were contractually tied to the upstart new bowl in Memphis, while qualifying for much more prestigious, long-standing bowls. By the end of the season, they were so successful that they made a trip to Memphis to get out of their contracts. 

Administrators from both universities together went to Dewey and pled their case. His response was, "We've already pre-sold most of our bowl tickets months in advance, mostly to small businesses who went out on a limb to support us. And if I were to let you out of your contracts now, the mob in Memphis would string me up." 

Both teams played in the Delta Bowl that season, 12th ranked Ole Miss defeating TCU 13-9 on New Year's Day, 1948, to a packed stadium.

Game results

See also
List of college bowl games

References

Defunct college football bowls
Recurring sporting events established in 1948
Recurring sporting events disestablished in 1949